This uniform polyhedron compound is a composition of 2 icosahedra. It has octahedral symmetry Oh. As a holosnub, it is represented by Schläfli symbol β{3,4} and Coxeter diagram .

The triangles in this compound decompose into two orbits under action of the symmetry group: 16 of the triangles lie in coplanar pairs in octahedral planes, while the other 24 lie in unique planes.

It shares the same vertex arrangement as a nonuniform truncated octahedron, having irregular hexagons alternating with long and short edges.

The icosahedron, as a uniform snub tetrahedron, is similar to these snub-pair compounds: compound of two snub cubes and compound of two snub dodecahedra.

Together with its convex hull, it represents the icosahedron-first projection of the nonuniform snub tetrahedral antiprism.

Cartesian coordinates 
Cartesian coordinates for the vertices of this compound are all the permutations of

 (±1, 0, ±τ)

where τ = (1+)/2 is the golden ratio (sometimes written φ).

Compound of two dodecahedra 
The dual compound has two dodecahedra as pyritohedra in dual positions:

References 
.

See also
 Compound of two snub cubes

External links 
 VRML model: 

Polyhedral compounds